The 20th Politburo of the Chinese Communist Party was elected by the 1st Plenary Session of the 20th Central Committee on 23 October 2022, shortly following the 20th National Congress. It was nominally preceded by the 19th Politburo.

Background
According to party convention, party leaders aged 68 or above are not eligible to remain in the Politburo. Prior to the Congress, CCP general secretary Xi Jinping stated that he would not be retiring, and instead would seek a third term of the paramount leader. 

On 22 October 2022, following publication of the list of members of the new Central Committee, it was reported that four of the seven Politburo Standing Committee members from the 19th Politburo were not on the list. Li Zhanshu, aged 72, and Han Zheng, aged 68 were expected to retire from the Politburo following the party convention. While Li Keqiang and Wang Yang were eligible to serve another term, as they are both aged 67, their absence from the list of the new Central Committee members instead means they will go into an early retirement. The three remaining Standing Committee members from the 19th Politburo were Xi Jinping, Wang Huning, and Zhao Leji.

Members

Standing Committee members

All members 
 In stroke order of surnames

Commentary 
The 20th CCP Politburo was noted as the first to include a former Minister of State Security and the first Politburo with no women in 25 years. All members are Han Chinese, the majority ethnic group in the country.

See also 
 Politburo Standing Committee of the Chinese Communist Party
 Politburo of the Chinese Communist Party
 Xi Jinping Administration

Notes

References 

 
Politburo of the Chinese Communist Party
2022 establishments in China
Xi Jinping